The Fordyce–Ricks House Historic District encompasses a locally rare collection of Adirondack Architecture structures located at 1501 Park Avenue in Hot Springs, Arkansas.  The district encompasses  of land that originally belonged to Samuel W. Fordyce, a prominent railroad executive who had a major role in promoting and developing Hot Springs as a resort community.  The district includes a -story octagonal log house, three outbuildings, and a landscaped rustic environment.   of the former estate are now a part of Hot Springs National Park.

The district was listed on the National Register of Historic Places in 2003.

See also
National Register of Historic Places listings in Garland County, Arkansas

References

Buildings and structures completed in 1904
Buildings and structures in Hot Springs, Arkansas
Historic districts on the National Register of Historic Places in Arkansas
National Register of Historic Places in Hot Springs, Arkansas
National Register of Historic Places in national parks